In mathematics, computer science, and logic, rewriting covers a wide range of methods of replacing subterms of a formula with other terms. Such methods may be achieved by rewriting systems (also known as rewrite systems, rewrite engines, or reduction systems). In their most basic form, they consist of a set of objects, plus relations on how to transform those objects.

Rewriting can be non-deterministic. One rule to rewrite a term could be applied in many different ways to that term, or more than one rule could be applicable. Rewriting systems then do not provide an algorithm for changing one term to another, but a set of possible rule applications. When combined with an appropriate algorithm, however, rewrite systems can be viewed as computer programs, and several theorem provers and declarative programming languages are based on term rewriting.

Example cases

Logic 
In logic, the procedure for obtaining the conjunctive normal form (CNF) of a formula can be implemented as a rewriting system. The rules of an example of such a system would be:

 (double negation elimination)
 (De Morgan's laws)

 (distributivity)

where the symbol indicates that an expression matching the left hand side of the rule can be rewritten to one formed by the right hand side, and the symbols each denote a subexpression. In such a system, each rule is chosen so that the left side is equivalent to the right side, and consequently when the left side matches a subexpression, performing a rewrite of that subexpression from left to right maintains logical consistency and value of the entire expression.

Arithmetic 
Term rewriting systems can be employed to compute arithmetic operations on natural numbers.
To this end, each such number has to be encoded as a term.
The simplest encoding is the one used in the Peano axioms, based on the constant 0 (zero) and the successor function S. For example, the numbers 0, 1, 2, and 3 are represented by the terms 0, S(0), S(S(0)), and S(S(S(0))), respectively.
The following term rewriting system can then be used to compute sum and product of given natural numbers.

 

For example, the computation of 2+2 to result in 4 can be duplicated by term rewriting as follows:
      
where the rule numbers are given above the rewrites-to arrow.

As another example, the computation of 2⋅2 looks like:
          
where the last step comprises the previous example computation.

Linguistics 
In linguistics, phrase structure rules, also called rewrite rules, are used in some systems of generative grammar, as a means of generating the grammatically correct sentences of a language. Such a rule typically takes the form , where A is a syntactic category label, such as noun phrase or sentence, and X is a sequence of such labels or morphemes, expressing the fact that A can be replaced by X in generating the constituent structure of a sentence. For example, the rule  means that a sentence can consist of a noun phrase (NP) followed by a verb phrase (VP); further rules will specify what sub-constituents a noun phrase and a verb phrase can consist of, and so on.

Abstract rewriting systems 

From the above examples, it is clear that we can think of rewriting systems in an abstract manner. We need to specify a set of objects and the rules that can be applied to transform them. The most general (unidimensional) setting of this notion is called an abstract reduction system or abstract rewriting system (abbreviated ARS). An ARS is simply a set A of objects, together with a binary relation → on A called the reduction relation, rewrite relation or just reduction.

The word problem for an ARS is determining, given x and y, whether . An object x in A is called reducible if there exists some other y in A such that ; otherwise it is called irreducible or a normal form. An object y is called a "normal form of x" if , and y is irreducible. If every object has at least one normal form, the ARS is called normalizing.  or x and y are said to be joinable if there exists some z with the property that . An ARS is said to possess the Church–Rosser property if  implies . An ARS is confluent if for all w, x, and y in A,   implies . An ARS is locally confluent if and only if for all w, x, and y in A,   implies . An ARS is said to be terminating or noetherian if there is no infinite chain . A confluent and terminating ARS is called convergent or canonical.

Important theorems for abstract rewriting systems are that an ARS is confluent iff it has the Church–Rosser property, Newman's lemma (a terminating ARS is confluent if and only if it is locally confluent), and that the word problem for an ARS is undecidable in general.

String rewriting systems 

A string rewriting system (SRS), also known as semi-Thue system, exploits the free monoid structure of the strings (words) over an alphabet to extend a rewriting relation, to all strings in the alphabet that contain left- and respectively right-hand sides of some rules as substrings. If the relation  is symmetric, then the system is called a Thue system.

In a SRS, the reduction relation  is compatible with the monoid operation, meaning that  implies  for all strings . In a Thue system, i.e. if  is symmetric, the rewrite relation  coincides with the Thue congruence .

The notion of a semi-Thue system essentially coincides with the presentation of a monoid. Since  is a congruence, we can define the factor monoid  of the free monoid  by the Thue congruence.

We immediately get some very useful connections with other areas of algebra. For example, the alphabet  with the rules , where  is the empty string, is a presentation of the free group on one generator. If instead the rules are just , then we obtain a presentation of the bicyclic monoid. Thus semi-Thue systems constitute a natural framework for solving the word problem for monoids and groups. In fact, every monoid has a presentation of the form , i.e. it may always be presented by a semi-Thue system, possibly over an infinite alphabet.

The word problem for a semi-Thue system is undecidable in general; this result is sometimes known as the Post–Markov theorem.

Term rewriting systems 

A term rewriting system (TRS) is a rewriting system whose objects are terms, which are expressions with nested sub-expressions. Also present in the rules are variables, which represent any possible term (though a single variable always represents the same term throughout a single rule).

In contrast to string rewriting systems, whose objects are sequences of symbols, the objects of a term rewriting system form a term algebra. A term can be visualized as a tree of symbols, the set of admitted symbols being fixed by a given signature.

Formal definition 

A term rewriting system is a set  of such rules. The subterm matching the left hand side of the rule is called a redex or reducible expression.

That rule can be applied at the numerator in the term  with the matching substitution , see picture 2. Applying that substitution to the rule's right-hand side yields the term , and replacing the numerator by that term yields , which is the result term of applying the rewrite rule. Alternately, the rule could have been applied to the denominator of the original term, yielding .

Termination
Termination issues of rewrite systems in general are handled in Abstract rewriting system#Termination and convergence. For term rewriting systems in particular, the following additional subtleties are to be considered.

Termination even of a system consisting of one rule with a linear left-hand side is undecidable.  Termination is also undecidable for systems using only unary function symbols; however, it is decidable for finite ground systems.

The following term rewrite system is normalizing, but not terminating, and not confluent:

The following two examples of terminating term rewrite systems are due to Toyama: 
 
and 

Their union is a non-terminating system, since

All these properties are satisfied by Toyama's examples.

See Rewrite order and Path ordering (term rewriting) for ordering relations used in termination proofs for term rewriting systems.

Higher-order rewriting systems 

Higher-order rewriting systems are a generalization of first-order term rewriting systems to lambda terms, allowing higher order functions and bound variables. Various results about first-order TRSs can be reformulated for HRSs as well.

Graph rewriting systems 

Graph rewrite systems are another generalization of term rewrite systems, operating on graphs instead of (ground-) terms / their corresponding tree representation.

Trace rewriting systems 
Trace theory provides a means for discussing multiprocessing in more formal terms, such as via the trace monoid and the history monoid.  Rewriting can be performed in trace systems as well.

Philosophy 

Rewriting systems can be seen as programs that infer end-effects from a list of cause-effect relationships.  In this way, rewriting systems can be considered to be automated causality provers.

See also
 Critical pair (logic)
Compiler
 Knuth–Bendix completion algorithm
 L-systems specify rewriting that is done in parallel.
 Referential transparency in computer science
 Regulated rewriting
 Rho calculus

Notes

Further reading 
  316 pages.
 Marc Bezem, Jan Willem Klop, Roel de Vrijer ("Terese"), Term Rewriting Systems ("TeReSe"), Cambridge University Press, 2003, . This is the most recent comprehensive monograph. It uses however a fair deal of non-yet-standard notations and definitions. For instance, the Church–Rosser property is defined to be identical with confluence.
 Nachum Dershowitz and Jean-Pierre Jouannaud "Rewrite Systems", Chapter 6 in Jan van Leeuwen (Ed.), Handbook of Theoretical Computer Science, Volume B: Formal Models and Semantics., Elsevier and MIT Press, 1990, pp. 243–320. The preprint of this chapter is freely available from the authors, but it is missing the figures.
 Nachum Dershowitz and David Plaisted. "Rewriting", Chapter 9 in John Alan Robinson and Andrei Voronkov (Eds.), Handbook of Automated Reasoning, Volume 1.
 Gérard Huet et Derek Oppen, Equations and Rewrite Rules, A Survey (1980) Stanford Verification Group, Report N° 15 Computer Science Department Report N° STAN-CS-80-785
 Jan Willem Klop. "Term Rewriting Systems", Chapter 1 in Samson Abramsky, Dov M. Gabbay and Tom Maibaum (Eds.), Handbook of Logic in Computer Science, Volume 2: Background: Computational Structures.
 David Plaisted. "Equational reasoning and term rewriting systems", in Dov M. Gabbay, C. J. Hogger and John Alan Robinson (Eds.), Handbook of Logic in Artificial Intelligence and Logic Programming, Volume 1.
 Jürgen Avenhaus and Klaus Madlener. "Term rewriting and equational reasoning". In Ranan B. Banerji (Ed.), Formal Techniques in Artificial Intelligence: A Sourcebook, Elsevier (1990).
 String rewriting
 Ronald V. Book and Friedrich Otto, String-Rewriting Systems, Springer (1993).
 Benjamin Benninghofen, Susanne Kemmerich and Michael M. Richter, Systems of Reductions. LNCS 277, Springer-Verlag (1987).
 Other
 Martin Davis, Ron Sigal, Elaine J. Weyuker, (1994) Computability, Complexity, and Languages: Fundamentals of Theoretical Computer Science – 2nd edition, Academic Press, .

External links 

 The Rewriting Home Page
 IFIP Working Group 1.6
 Researchers in rewriting by Aart Middeldorp, University of Innsbruck
 Termination Portal
 Maude System — a software implementation of a generic term rewriting system.

References 

Formal languages
Logic in computer science
Mathematical logic
Rewriting systems